Pendragon is a Welsh word meaning "head dragon".

Pendragon may also refer to:

People
 Arthur Uther Pendragon (born John Timothy Rothwell, 5 April 1954), an English eco-campaigner, Neo-Druid leader, media personality, and self-declared reincarnation of King Arthur
 Lachlan Pendragon, (fl. 2020's) Oscar-nominated Australian animator
 The Pendragons, husband and wife team, Jonathan and Charlotte Pendragon,  of illusionists

Legendary people
 Ambrosius Aurelianus or "Aurelius", son of Constantine II of Britain, called "Pendragon" in the Vulgate Cycle
 King Arthur, son of Uther
 Uther Pendragon, brother of Aurelius and father of King Arthur

Arts, entertainment, and media

Anime
 Pendragon, the capital city of the Holy Britannian Empire in the anime Code Geass: Lelouch of the Rebellion
Pendragon, one alias of the wizard, Howl, in Howl's Moving Castle

Comics
 Arturia Pendragon, Saber a character in the Fate/stay night anime
 Knights of Pendragon, a Marvel UK comic during the early 1990s

Literature
 Pendragon: Journal of an Adventure through Time and Space, a series of ten novels by D. J. MacHale
 Pendragon: Before the War, a spin-off series created by D. J. MacHale, written by Walter Scrolls, and Carla Jablonski
 Pendragon Cycle, a series of fantasy books by Stephen R. Lawhead
 The Pendragon Legend (1933), a novel by Hungarian author Antal Szerb

Other arts, entertainment, and media
 Pendragon (band), an English neo-progressive rock band
 Pendragon (role-playing game)
 Pendragon: Sword of His Father, a 2008 Christian film

Enterprises
 Pendragon PLC, a UK car dealership chain
 Pendragon Press, a British small press in Maesteg, Wales
 Pendragon Records, a record label

Other uses
 Pendragon Castle, a ruin in Cumbria, built by Uther Pendragon according to legend
 Mount Pendragon, a mountain in the South Shetland Islands of Antarctica

See also
 Arthur Pendragon (disambiguation)